The Outdoor Room was an Australian lifestyle television program hosted by Jamie Durie on the Seven Network in 2008 with repeats broadcast on 7Two. The Outdoor Room is a backyard improvement show that saw Durie design a new backyard for a worthy family, similar to his previous show Backyard Blitz. He was seen travelling to various countries around the world to seek inspiration and gain new ideas before coming home to start work on the design with his team. Along with reuniting with former Backyard Blitz horticulturist Jody Rigby, each week Durie was also joined by a prominent Australian chef who serves up a dish from each episode's country of inspiration.

It did not return for a second season due to budgetary constraints to produce each episode but an American version of the show was produced. HGTV picked up the series with Jamie Durie, produced by Scout Productions, Emmy Award-winning producers of Queer Eye for the Straight Guy.  Running for four seasons and 52 episodes, the series was produced by showrunner Michael Hauser.

Episodes

Ratings are based on the average of the total ratings for Australian mainland capital cities.
This episode was a one-hour series premiere.
This episode aired half an hour later at 7pm due to a Seven News special in its regular timeslot.

See also
 List of programs broadcast by Seven Network
 List of Australian television series

References

External links
 

Seven Network original programming
2008 Australian television series debuts
2008 Australian television series endings
Australian non-fiction television series
Australian travel television series
Gardening television